The Connecticut Education Network (CEN) is a regional research and education network.  The network provides internet services for Connecticut K-12 schools, libraries, and higher education institutions.  CEN provides a fiber optic connection to each and every K-12 school district in the state of Connecticut, fully funded by the state's general fund and federal e-rate dollars.
CEN also offers an ISP program for paying customers.  These include both public and private higher education institutions as well as other educational entities.

History
Then Lieutenant Governor, Jodi Rell, launched an unprecedented effort to guarantee that Connecticut’s schools and libraries have access to the best possible technology and that students are “cyber-ready” by the sixth grade. Her work resulted in the creation of the Connecticut Education Network, the nation’s first all-optical network.  The Connecticut Education Network was signed into law in the year 2000 under Connecticut general statute §4d-82a. By 2005, every public school district in Connecticut was online.

References

Academic computer network organizations
Science and technology in Connecticut